Justin Timothy Braun (born February 10, 1987) is an American professional ice hockey player for the Philadelphia Flyers of the National Hockey League (NHL). Braun was born in Saint Paul, Minnesota, and grew up nearby in White Bear Lake, Minnesota. He previously played for the San Jose Sharks and the New York Rangers.

Playing career

Amateur
Braun was born in Vadnais Heights, Minnesota, and began playing ice hockey at the urging of his older brother, Eric. He attended White Bear Lake Area High School in White Bear Lake, Minnesota, making the varsity ice hockey team in his sophomore year. Braun helped lead White Bear to two state tournament appearances, including in 2005, when he served as team captain. After high school, he spent two seasons with the Green Bay Gamblers of the United States Hockey League (USHL), where he scored 13 points (two goals and 11 assists) across 69 games.

On May 24, 2006, the University of Massachusetts Amherst announced that Braun and five other players would join the UMass Minutemen ice hockey that fall. He scored his first college point on October 13, 2006, assisting Kevin Jarman in a 3–2 victory over the Sacred Heart Pioneers. His first collegiate goal came on January 27, against Boston University. At the end of the season, Braun was chosen as the Minutemen's Rookie of the Year, with four goals and seven assists, and was named to the Hockey East All-Rookie Team. Braun was selected in the seventh round, 201st overall, of the 2007 NHL Entry Draft by the San Jose Sharks of the National Hockey League (NHL).

Professional
In the 2010–11 season, Braun made his NHL debut November 26, 2010 against the Vancouver Canucks. His first point came the next night in a game against the Edmonton Oilers. His first NHL goal was in his fourth game, on December 2, 2010 against Pascal Leclaire of the Ottawa Senators. On October 4, 2013 against the Canucks, Braun scored his first goal since February 21, 2012, an 85-game stretch without a goal.

After completing his ninth season with San Jose in the 2018–19 season, on June 18, 2019, Braun was traded by the Sharks to the Philadelphia Flyers in exchange for a 2019 second round draft pick and 2020 third-round selection.

On October 5, 2020, Braun opted to forgo free-agency and signed a two-year, $3.6 million contract extension with the Flyers.

During the 2021–22 season, with the Flyers out of playoff contention, Braun was traded to the New York Rangers in exchange for a 2023 third-round selection on March 21, 2022. Adding a dependable veteran presence to the blueline, Braun was a mainstay throughout the playoffs, registering 1 assist in 19 games to help the Rangers reach the Conference Finals.

As a free agent from the Rangers, Braun opted to return to former club in the Philadelphia Flyers, signing a one-year, $1 million contract on July 13, 2022.

Personal life
Braun is married to Jessica Lysiak, a private chef, who is the daughter of former NHL All-star Tom Lysiak. She competed on Season 4 of the American version of the television show MasterChef in 2013, finishing in 3rd place. They have two daughters, Madison (born January 2016) and Summer Grace (born June 2021). He has two brothers, Eric and Bryan.
Parents are Paul Braun and Carol Reamer.

Career statistics

Regular season and playoffs

International

Awards and honors

References

External links

1987 births
Living people
AHCA Division I men's ice hockey All-Americans
American expatriate ice hockey players in Finland
American men's ice hockey defensemen
Green Bay Gamblers players
Ice hockey people from Saint Paul, Minnesota
People from Vadnais Heights, Minnesota
New York Rangers players
Philadelphia Flyers players
San Jose Sharks draft picks
San Jose Sharks players
Tappara players
UMass Minutemen ice hockey players
Worcester Sharks players